The Three Pilots is a 1942 Italian war drama film directed by Mario Mattoli and starring Michela Belmonte, Leonardo Cortese and Alberto Sordi. It was shot at the Cinecittà Studios in Rome and at the Accademia Aeronautica in Caserta. The film's sets were designed by the art director.

Cast
 Michela Belmonte as Adriana Terrazzani
 Leonardo Cortese as Marco Massi
 Carlo Minello as Mario Terrazzani
 Alberto Sordi as Filippo Nardini
 Galeazzo Benti as Andrea Torelli
 Enrico Effernelli as Fioresi
 Pietro Bigerna as Cesarini 
 Paolo Carlini as Un allievo aviere 
 Piero Carnabuci as Il generale commandante
 Leo Catozzo as Il maggiore addetto ai servizi 
 Vianora di San Giusto as La signora Terrazzani 
 Cesare Erminio as Un allievo ufficiale
 Riccardo Fellini as Un allievo aviere 
 Mario Liberati as Il maresciallo istruttore

References

Bibliography
 Brunetta, Gian Piero. The History of Italian Cinema: A Guide to Italian Film from Its Origins to the Twenty-first Century.  Princeton University Press, 2009.

External links

1942 films
1940s war drama films
1940s Italian-language films
Italian black-and-white films
Films directed by Mario Mattoli
Italian aviation films
Films set in Campania
Italian war drama films
Films shot at Cinecittà Studios
1942 drama films
Films scored by Renzo Rossellini
1940s Italian films